The Buffalo Mine is an abandoned silver mine located in Cobalt, Ontario, Canada.

See also
Cobalt silver rush

References

External links

Buffalo Mine, Cobalt, Coleman Township, Timiskaming District, Ontario, Canada

Silver mines in Canada
Mines in Cobalt, Ontario